Swansea Wind Street railway station served the city of Swansea, in the historical county of Glamorganshire, Wales, from 1863 of 1873 on the Vale of Neath Railway.

History 
The station was opened on 1 August 1863 by the Great Western Railway. The owners of a nearby coal yard objected to it being built because it interfered with the passage of their coal trains. It closed on 1 March 1873. Services were diverted to East Dock after closure.

References 

Disused railway stations in Swansea
Former Great Western Railway stations
Railway stations in Great Britain opened in 1863
Railway stations in Great Britain closed in 1873
1863 establishments in Wales
1873 disestablishments in Wales